PGMC may refer to:
 Philadelphia Gay Men's Chorus
 Portland Gay Men's Chorus
 Proto-Germanic language (PGmc)